A  list of VLF-transmitters and LF-transmitters, which work or worked on frequencies below 100 kHz.

List of VLF transmissions

Demolished

References

Time signal radio stations
Radio navigation
Submarines
Military radio systems
Radio spectrum